The Kingdom of the Isles was a Norse-Gaelic kingdom comprising the Isle of Man, the Hebrides and the islands of the Clyde from the 9th to the 13th centuries AD. The territory is sometimes called the Kingdom of Mann and the Isles, although only some of the later rulers claimed that title. The historical record is incomplete, and the kingdom was not a continuous entity throughout the entire period. At times the rulers were independent of external control, although for much of the period they had overlords in Norway, Ireland, England, Scotland or Orkney. At times there also appear to have been competing claims for all or parts of the territory.

Viking influence in the area began in the late 8th century, and whilst there is no doubt that the  dynasty played a prominent role in this early period, the records for the dates and details of the rulers are speculative until the mid-10th century. Hostility between the Kings of the Isles and the rulers of Ireland, and intervention by the crown of Norway (either directly or through their vassal the Earl of Orkney) were recurring themes.

The  contains mention of several persons who are said to have come to Iceland from Sodor, which appears to be these , before or around the middle of the 10th century.

An invasion by Magnus Barefoot in the late 11th century resulted in a brief period of direct Norwegian rule over the kingdom, but soon the descendants of Godred Crovan re-asserted a further period of largely independent overlordship. This came to an end with the emergence of Somerled, on whose death in 1164 the kingdom was split in two. Just over a century later, the islands became part of the Kingdom of Scotland, following the 1266 Treaty of Perth.

Geography

The principal islands under consideration are as follows:
 The Isle of Man, located in the Irish Sea equidistant from modern England, Northern Ireland, Scotland and Wales.
 The southern Inner Hebrides to the west and north of the Kintyre peninsula, including Islay, Jura, Mull and Iona.
 The Inner Hebrides to the north of Ardnamurchan, made up of the Small Isles (including Eigg and Rùm), Skye, Raasay and their outliers.
 The Outer Hebrides, aka the "Long Island" to the west, separated from the northern Inner Hebrides by the waters of the Minch.

 the Islands of the Clyde , 7% of the total
 the Inner Hebrides , 50% of the total and
the Outer Hebrides , 36% of the total.

Anglesey in modern Wales may also have been part of the insular Viking world from an early stage.

Early history

Sources

The presence of the monastery on Iona led to this part of Scotland being relatively well documented from the mid-6th to the mid-9th centuries. However, from 849 on, when Columba's relics were removed in the face of Viking incursions, written evidence from local sources all but vanishes for three hundred years. The sources for information about the Hebrides and indeed much of northern Scotland from the 8th to the 11th century are thus almost exclusively Irish, English or Norse. The English and Irish sources are more contemporary, but may have "led to a southern bias in the story", especially as much of the Hebridean archipelago became Norse-speaking during the period under consideration. The archaeological record for this period is relatively scant, particularly in comparison to the numerous Neolithic and Iron Age finds in the area.

Scholarly interpretations of the period "have led to widely divergent reconstructions of Viking Age Scotland" and Barrett (2008) has identified four competing theories, none of which he regards as proven.

It is clear that the word "king", as used by and of the rulers of Norwegian descent in the isles, was not intended to convey sovereign rule (that is, that of a High King). This is different from the way the word was used in the emerging Kingdom of Scotland at the time. It should also be borne in mind that different kings may have ruled over very different areas and that few of them can be seen as exerting any kind of close control over this "far-flung sea kingdom". Precise dates are sometimes a matter of debate amongst historians.

Early Viking incursions in the Hebrides

According to Ó Corráin (1998) "when and how the Vikings conquered and occupied the Isles is unknown, perhaps unknowable", although from 793 onwards repeated raids by Vikings on the British Isles are recorded. "All the islands of Britain" were devastated in 794 with Iona being sacked in 802 and 806. Another early reference to the Norse presence in the Irish records is that there was a king of "Viking Scotland" whose heir, took an army to Ireland in 848.

This term was variously used in succeeding centuries to refer to individuals of mixed Scandinavian–Celtic descent and/or culture who became dominant in southwest Scotland, parts of northern England and the isles.

Harald pursued his enemies and incorporated the Northern Isles into his kingdom in 875 and then, perhaps a little over a decade later, the Hebrides as well. The following year the local Viking chieftains of the Hebrides rebelled. However, Woolf (2007) suggests that his appearance in the sagas "looks very much like a story created in later days to legitimise Norwegian claims to sovereignty in the region".

It has been suggested that his appearance looks "very much like the product of fourteenth-century propagandists from Clann Donald".

House of 
It is therefore likely that Scandinavian hegemony was already significant on the western coasts of Scotland by then.   is described as the "son of the king of " in the Fragmentary Annals of Ireland and Ó Corráin (1998) argues that  "is Viking Scotland and probably includes Man" at this time suggesting an early date for an organised Kingdom of the Isles. The Norse may have taken the Isle of Man in 877 and they certainly held it by 900. In 902 the Vikings were expelled from Dublin for up to a dozen years, and a year later , the "grandson of " was killed in battle with the forces of Constantine II in mainland Scotland. However these events were setbacks for the Norse rather than a definitive moment.

The first four decades of the 10th century are an obscure period so far as the Hebrides are concerned. It is possible that , who probably ruled Mann during this period may have had some influence. However,  is the next King of the Isles on record.

's brother  then succeeded him. During their lifetimes these two "sons of Harald" are known to have launched at least two major expeditions against Ireland, and the latter is recorded as having won "the battle of Man" in 987. Iona was sacked twice, in 986 and 987, 's later piety notwithstanding. The Annals of Ulster record Gofraid's death in Dalriada in 989, describing him as "king of " although it is not clear if this was a completely new term or had originally been used earlier, perhaps to refer to 's island kingdom. The complex geography of western Scotland and the lack of written records makes certainty about the extent and nature of these kingdoms hard to fathom. For example, the Chronicle of the Kings of Alba indicates that almost all these kings who reigned from the mid-10th to the late 11th century were buried on Iona. This may mean that Iona and Mull lay either within or close to the emerging Kingdom of Scotland. Furthermore, two records in the Annals of Innisfallen hint that the Western Isles may not have been "organised into a kingdom or earldom" at this time but rather that they were "ruled by assemblies of freeholders who regularly elected lawmen to preside over their public affairs".

Earls of Orkney and kings of Dublin

At this point the  once again becomes the main source of information about the north. In 990 Sigurd the Stout, Earl of Orkney took control of the Hebrides, and placed a  called  in charge. By 1004 the isles' independence had been re-asserted under 's son , who died in that year. It is possible their rule overlapped, with 's zone of influence to the north and Ragnal's to the south. According to the Welsh text   is recorded as having been king of a wide variety of places on his death in 1034. These included the Isle of Man, "many of the other islands of Denmark", Galloway, the Rhinns, and Anglesey. Olaf was an  dynast and it is difficult to reconcile his rule with that of the Norwegians who apparently came before and after him according to the sagas. There is also an obscure reference in The Prophecy of Berchán hinting that King  of Scotland may have been active in Islay and Arran at about this time, emphasising the potentially fluid nature of Scandinavian, Norse-Gael and Scots influence during this period.

The next recorded ruler is Sigurd the Stout's son Thorfinn the Mighty, who took control circa 1035 until his own death some two decades later. This monarch of Norway was Magnus Haraldsson, who may have used the death of Thorfinn as an excuse to exert direct rule of Orkney and the Hebrides.

However, in the mid-11th century the  dynast  is said to be the ruler of Mann. He was also King of Dublin from 1036–1038 and 1046–1052 as well as possibly being the King of the Rhinns in Galloway, suggesting that the overlordship of the Isle of Man and the Hebrides were once again sundered (although it is possible he ruled over part or all of the Hebrides as well).

 is then recorded as having control of Mann and Dublin followed by his father , the High King of Ireland, who took possession of Mann and the Isles until his death in 1072. Godred Sitricson and his son Fingal Godredson then ruled in Mann at least, but the records for the rulers of the Hebrides remain obscure until the arrival of Godred Crovan.

Godred Crovan and Irish influence

"Crovan" probably means "white hand" although the reason is unknown and his origins are also uncertain. He was a survivor of Harald Hardraade's defeat at the Battle of Stamford Bridge in 1066 and fled from there to Man. Little is then heard of him until he succeeded in taking the island from Fingal in 1079, possibly with the help of troops from the Western Isles. The ancestor of many of the succeeding rulers of Mann and the Isles, he also became King of Dublin, but no contemporary source refers either to him or any of his predecessors as "King of Mann and the Isles" as such. It is not clear the extent to which  dominance was now asserted in the islands north of Man, but growing Irish influence in these seas brought a rapid and decisive response from Norway. A high level of political instability is suggested by the battle fought on the Isle of Man at Santwat in 1098. This was internal strife between the men of the north of the island under , and the southerners led by a man named MacManus or Macmaras.

Later history

Norse and  influence
Perhaps as a result of general disorder in the islands, and to counter Irish influence there, Magnus Barefoot had re-established direct Norwegian overlordship by 1098. He first took Orkney, the northern Scottish mainland and the Hebrides, where he "dyed his sword red in blood" in the Uists. By taking command of his ship's tiller and "sailing" across the isthmus he was able to claim the entire peninsula was an island, and it remained under Norwegian rule for more than a dozen years as a result.

In 1098, Edgar of Scotland signed a treaty with Magnus that settled much of the boundary between the Scots and Norwegian claims in the islands. Edgar formally acknowledged the existing situation by giving up his claims to the Hebrides and Kintyre.

A second expedition in 1102 saw incursions into Ireland; the  saga reports that he obtained 's daughter  in marriage to his young son, Sigurd, whom he then left in nominal charge of the isles. This arrangement did not last long. On 23 August 1103 Magnus was killed fighting in Ulster and the 14-year-old Sigurd returned to Norway without his bride. The next king was Lagmann Godredsson, Godred Crovan's son, who was apparently appointed with Sigurd's consent. He successfully fought off a rebellion by his brother Harald and after reigning for seven years he abdicated "repenting that he had put out his brother's eyes" and went on a pilgrimage to Jerusalem, where he died.

Lagmann abdicated during his surviving son Olave's minority, and either by force or the invitation of the nobility of the Isles  (Domnall MacTade O'Brien), a grandson of Echmarcach mac Ragnaill, became overlord of the isles in 1111. Whatever his route to accession, he proved to be an unpopular tyrant and was expelled by the Islesmen after two years, fleeing to Ireland.

Two years later Sigurd attempted to appoint Ingemund (whose background is unknown) to take possession of the kingdom of the Isles. However, when Ingemund arrived on Lewis he sent messengers to all the chiefs of the Isles to summon them to assemble and declare him king. In the meantime he and his followers spent the time in "plundering and revelling. They violated girls and matrons, and gave themselves up to every species of pleasure amid sensual gratification. When the news reached the chiefs of the Isles, who had already assembled to appoint him king, they were inflamed with great rage, hastened against him, and coming upon him in the night, set fire to the house in which he was, and destroyed, partly by the sword and partly by the flames, Ingemund and all his followers."

The next recorded king was Godred Crovan's son Olave Godredsson, also known as "the Red" to the Highlanders and "" to the Norwegians, the latter apparently on account of his small size. He had spent time at the court of Henry I of England, who may have encouraged his ambitions in an attempt to minimise  dominance over the Irish Sea and environs. Olave reigned for forty years, managing to maintain a degree of peace and stability throughout. Nevertheless, the era was not without incident. During his time , one of the Hebridean nobles, took Dublin by force and held it for six years before his assassination in 1148. Oitir's son Thorfinn was described as the most powerful of the Hebridean lords in 1150. In 1152 Olave's nephews in Dublin rose against him and attacked Man, killing him in the process.

Olave's son Godred the Black succeeded him and had his father's killers executed. Shortly thereafter the warring Mac Lochlainn clan in Ireland along with "the fleet of Galloway, Arran, Kintyre, Man, and the territories of Scotland" are recorded fighting a naval battle off Inishowen against the  dynasty. During his reign the citizens of Dublin offered Godred the rule of the city, which he accepted. Then, according to the Manx Chronicle, he inflicted a heavy defeat on his erstwhile Mac Lochlainn allies, following which he and his chieftains returned to the islands, leaving the city to the invading forces of Diarmait Mac Murchada.

Somerled

Godred's dictatorial style appears to have made him very unpopular with the Islesmen, and the ensuing conflicts were the beginning of the end for Mann and the Isles as a coherent territory under the rule of a single magnate. The powerful barons of the isles began plotting with an emerging and forceful figure – Somerled, Lord of Argyll. Somerled's parental origins are obscure, but it is known that he had married , daughter of Olave the Red and Godred's half-sister. It is possible that Somerled first found favour with Olave by helping him wrest control of the northern Hebrides from the Earls of Orkney, whose influence had once more spread into the Sudreys. When Godred heard of this he engaged Somerled's forces in the naval Battle of Epiphany in 1156. There was no clear victor, but it was subsequently agreed that Godred would remain the ruler of Man, the northern Inner Hebrides and the Outer Hebrides, whilst Somerled's young sons would nominally control the southern Inner Hebrides, Kintyre and the islands of the Clyde under their father's supervision. Two years later Somerled's invasion of the Isle of Man caused Godred to flee to Norway, leaving the former as undisputed ruler of the entire realm.

The Hebrides had been difficult to control from a distance since the days of Ketill Flatnose, and even in the time of Magnus Barelegs it is likely that de facto control was that of local rulers rather than nominal governance from over the seas. Somerled took this to its ultimate conclusion, declaring himself an independent ruler of the isles from his power base in the southern Hebrides and Kintyre and he had, in effect, recreated Dalriada. There has been some debate about the source of legitimacy Somerled used.

Somerled met his death in 1164, possibly assassinated in his tent as he camped near Renfrew during an invasion of the Scottish mainland. However, their descendants do not seem to have held this title and The Chronicle of Man and the Sudreys lamented that Somerled's marriage to  "was the cause of the ruin of the whole kingdom of the Isles".

A divided kingdom

Somerled's descendants eventually became known as the Lords of the Isles, with Dubgall giving rise to Clan MacDougall, and Raghnall to Clan Donald and Clan Macruari. Aonghas and his three sons were killed on Skye in 1210. In theory Somerled and his descendants' island territories were subject to Norway and his mainland ones to the Kingdom of Alba, whilst the Kings of Mann and the North Isles were vassals of the Kings of Norway.

However, both during and after Somerled's life the Scottish monarchs sought to take control of the islands he and his descendants held. Diplomacy having failed to achieve much, in 1249 Alexander II took personal command of a large fleet that sailed from the Firth of Clyde and anchored off the island of Kerrera. Alexander became ill and died there, but the action was continued by his successor Alexander III. This strategy eventually led to an invasion by Haakon Haakonarson, King of Norway. After the stalemate of the Battle of Largs, Haakon retreated to Orkney, where he died in December 1263, entertained on his death bed by recitations of the sagas. Following this ill-fated expedition, the Hebrides and Mann and all rights that the Norwegian crown "had of old therein" were yielded to the Kingdom of Scotland as a result of the 1266 Treaty of Perth.

In Man, having overcome his usurper brother Ragnald who reigned for a brief time in 1164, Godred the Black resumed his kingship of Mann and the North Isles. On his death in 1187, the kingship passed to his eldest son, Raghnall mac Gofraidh, rather than his chosen successor, Olaf the Black (Raghnall's half-brother), who instead became overlord of Lewis. In 1228, Olaf battled Raghnall at Tynwald and the latter was slain. On 21 May 1237, Olaf died on St Patrick's Isle, and was succeeded by his three sons who all ruled the kingdom in turn: Harald (reigned 1237–1248), Ragnvald (1249), and Magnus (1252–1265). Magnus Olafsson was the last of the Norse kings to rule Mann, which was absorbed into the Kingdom of Scotland on his death.

Life in Norse times

As with written records, the archaeological evidence for this period is not extensive, and knowledge of the daily lives of the population is lacking. It is known that the Hebrides were taxed using the Ounceland system and evidence from Bornais suggests that settlers there may have been more prosperous than families of a similar status in the Northern Isles, possibly owing to a more relaxed political regime. Latterly, the Hebrides sent eight representatives from Lewis, Harris and Skye and another eight from the southern Hebrides to the Tynwald parliament on Man.

Colonsay and Oronsay have produced important pagan Norse burial grounds. An 11th-century cross slab decorated with Irish and Ringerike Viking art found on Islay was found in 1838. , today an uninhabited peninsula to the south of the Cuillin hills on Skye, contains the small , which is connected to the sea by a short artificial canal.  This loch was an important site for maritime activity for many centuries, spanning the Viking and later periods of Scottish clan rule. There is a stone-built quay and a system to maintain constant water levels. Boat timbers discovered there have been dated to the 12th century. Only three rune stones are known from the west coast of Scotland, on Christian memorials found on Barra, Inchmarnock and Iona.

Gaelic continued to exist as a spoken language in the southern Hebrides throughout the Norse settlement period, but place-name evidence suggests it had a lowly status. The obliteration of pre-Norse names is almost total. There is little continuity of style between Pictish pottery in the north and that of the early Viking period. The similarities that do exist suggests the later pots may have been made by Norse who had settled in Ireland, or by Irish slaves. In the Firth of Clyde, Norse burials have been found on Arran, although not on Bute, and place-name evidence suggests a settlement pattern that was much less well-developed than in the Hebrides. There are numerous Manx Runestones and place names of Norse origin on the Isle of Man.

Initially a pagan culture, detailed information about the return of the Christian religion to the islands during the Norse-era is elusive, although the modern-day Diocese of Sodor and Man retains the centuries-old name.

See also

 Duke of Argyll
 Kings of Jorvik
 List of Manx consorts
 List of rulers of the Kingdom of the Isles
 Lord of Mann
 Lords of Galloway

References

Notes

Footnotes

Sources
Anderson, Alan Orr (1922) Early Sources of Scottish History: A.D. 500 to 1286. 2. Edinburgh. Oliver and Boyd.
 Ballin Smith, Beverley; Taylor, Simon; and Williams, Gareth (eds) (2007) West Over Sea: Studies in Scandinavian Sea-borne Expansion and Settlement Before 1300. Brill. 
 Barrett, James H. "The Norse in Scotland" in Brink, Stefan (ed) (2008) The Viking World. Abingdon. Routledge. 
 Coventry, Martin (2008) Castles of the Clans. Musselburgh. Goblinshead. 
 Crawford, Barbara E. (1987) Scandinavian Scotland. Leicester University Press. 
 Downham, Clare "England and the Irish-Sea Zone in the Eleventh Century" in Gillingham, John (ed) (2004) Anglo-Norman Studies XXVI: Proceedings of the Battle Conference 2003. Woodbridge. Boydell Press. 
 Downham, Clare (2007) Viking Kings of Britain and Ireland: The Dynasty of Ívarr to A.D. 1014. Edinburgh. Dunedin Academic Press. 

 Etchingham, Colman (2001) "North Wales, Ireland and the Isles: the Insular Viking Zone". Peritia. 15 pp. 145–87
 Gregory, Donald (1881) The History of the Western Highlands and Isles of Scotland 1493–1625. Edinburgh. Birlinn. 2008 reprint – originally published by Thomas D. Morrison. 
 Graham-Campbell, James and Batey, Colleen E. (1998) Vikings in Scotland: An Archaeological Survey. Edinburgh University Press. 
 Haswell-Smith, Hamish (2004) The Scottish Islands. Edinburgh. Canongate. 
 Hunter, James (2000) Last of the Free: A History of the Highlands and Islands of Scotland. Edinburgh. Mainstream. 
 Jennings, Andrew and Kruse, Arne "One Coast-Three Peoples: Names and Ethnicity in the Scottish West during the Early Viking period" in Woolf, Alex (ed.) (2009)
 Johnstone J. (ed) (1780) Anecdotes Of Olave The Black, King Of Man, And The Hebridian Princes Of The Somerled Family (by Thordr) To Which Are Added Xviii. Eulogies On Haco King Of Norway, By Snorro Sturlson, Publ. With A Literal Version And Notes. Nottingham University.
 McDonald, R. Andrew (2007) The Kingdom of the Isles: Scotland's Western Seaboard c. 1100 – c. 1336. East Linton. Tuckwell Press. 
Marsden, John (2008) "Somerled and the Emergence of Gaelic Scotland". Edinburgh. Birlinn. 
Munch, P.A. (ed) and Rev. Goss (tr) (1874) Chronica regnum Manniae et insularum: The Chronicle of Man and the Sudreys. Volume 1. Douglas, Isle of Man. The Manx Society. Retrieved 9 January 2011.
 Murray, W.H. (1973) The Islands of Western Scotland. London. Eyre Methuen. 
 Murray, W.H. (1977) The Companion Guide to the West Highlands of Scotland. London. Collins.
 Ó Corráin, Donnchadh (Mar 1979) "High-Kings, Vikings and Other Kings". Irish Historical Studies 22 No. 83 pp. 283–323. Irish Historical Studies Publications.
 Ó Corráin, Donnchadh (1998) Vikings in Ireland and Scotland in the Ninth Century CELT.
 Oram, Richard (2004) David I: The King Who Made Scotland. Stroud. Tempus. 
 Pálsson, Hermann and Edwards, Paul Geoffrey (1981). Orkneyinga Saga: The History of the Earls of Orkney. Penguin Classics. 
.
 Sellar, William David Hamilton Hebridean sea kings: The successors of Somerled, 1164–1316 in Cowan, Edward J. and McDonald, Russell Andrew (eds) (2000) Alba: Celtic Scotland in the middle ages. Tuckwell Press. 
 Thomson, William P. L. (2008) The New History of Orkney. Edinburgh. Birlinn. 
 Sharples, Niall and Smith, Rachel "Norse settlement in the Western Isles" in Woolf, Alex (ed.) (2009)
 Sheehan, John and Ó Corráin, Donnchadh (2010) The Viking Age: Ireland and the West. Proceedings of the Fifteenth Viking Congress. Dublin. Four Courts Press. 
 Woolf, Alex (2005) "The origins and ancestry of Somerled: Gofraid mac Fergusa and 'The Annals of the Four Masters'". Mediaeval Scandinavia.15 pp. 199–213.
 Woolf, Alex "The Age of the Sea-Kings: 900–1300" in Omand, Donald (ed) (2006) The Argyll Book. Edinburgh. Birlinn. 
 Woolf, Alex (2007) From Pictland to Alba, 789–1070. The New Edinburgh History of Scotland. Edinburgh. Edinburgh University Press. 
 Woolf, Alex (ed.) (2009) Scandinavian Scotland – Twenty Years After. St Andrews. St Andrews University Press.

External links
 

 
9th-century establishments in Scotland
9th century in Scotland
13th-century disestablishments in Scotland
Former countries in Europe
 Kingdom of the Isles
Scandinavian Scotland
Norway–Scotland relations
Kingdom of Norway (872–1397)
Former kingdoms
Island countries